In molecular biology, the PRINTS database is a collection of so-called "fingerprints": it provides both a detailed annotation resource for protein families, and a diagnostic tool for newly determined sequences. A fingerprint is a group of conserved motifs taken from a multiple sequence alignment - together, the motifs form a characteristic signature for the aligned protein family. The motifs themselves are not necessarily contiguous in sequence, but may come together in 3D space to define molecular binding sites or interaction surfaces. The particular diagnostic strength of fingerprints lies in their ability to distinguish sequence differences at the clan, superfamily, family and subfamily levels. This allows fine-grained functional diagnoses of uncharacterised sequences, allowing, for example, discrimination between family members on the basis of the ligands they bind or the proteins with which they interact, and highlighting potential oligomerisation or allosteric sites.

PRINTS is a founding partner of the integrated resource, InterPro, a widely used database of protein families, domains and functional sites.

References

External links
PRINTS Database (University of Manchester Bioinformatics Education and Research)

Biological databases
Department of Computer Science, University of Manchester